In chemistry, a protic solvent is a solvent that has a hydrogen atom bound to an oxygen (as in a hydroxyl group ), a nitrogen (as in an amine group  or ), or fluoride (as in hydrogen fluoride). In general terms, any solvent that contains a labile  is called a protic solvent. The molecules of such solvents readily donate protons to solutes, often via hydrogen bonding. Water is the most common protic solvent. Conversely, polar aprotic solvents cannot donate protons but still have the ability to dissolve many salts.

Methods for purification of common solvents are available

See also 
 Autoprotolysis

References 

Solvents